Agit Kabayel (born 23 September 1992) is a German professional boxer. At regional level, he has held multiple heavyweight championships, including the European title twice from March 2023 to present, and previously between 2017 and 2019.

Professional career

European heavyweight champion 
Kabayel compiled a perfect record of 15–0 before winning the vacant European heavyweight title with a unanimous decision victory against Herve Hubeaux on 24 February 2017 in Cologne, Germany.

In his next fight, Kabayel defended his European heavyweight title against former WBC world title challenger Derek Chisora at the Casino de Monte Carlo Salle Medcin in Monte Carlo, Monaco on 4 November 2017. Chisora was ranked #8 by the WBC at the time. In a largely low-key affair, Kabayel outboxed his opponent to a majority decision victory. The judges' scorecards read 115–113, 115–114, 114–114 in Kabayel's favour, handing Chisora his 8th professional loss. Chisora started the fight slow, remaining patient. He became more active after round 6, but failed to bustle the attack on Kabayel, who moved well with his feet. Kabayel also used quick combinations and jabs to win many of the rounds.

On 2 March 2019, Kabayel beat Andriy Rudenko by unanimous decision in a 12 round contest.

Career from 2020 
On 18 July 2020, Kabayel beat Evgenios Lazaridis by unanimous decision in their 10 round contest to win the vacant WBA Continental heavyweight title. The scorecards read 98–92, 100–90, 99–91 in favour of Kabayel.

In November 2020, it was revealed that Kabayel was in talks to challenge undefeated WBC and The Ring heavyweight champion Tyson Fury on 5 December 2020 at the Royal Albert Hall, London, and that he had been sent a contract by Fury's promoter Frank Warren. However, the fight was ultimately cancelled, due to complications with Fury's contractual disputes with former WBC champion Deontay Wilder regarding a potential trilogy fight between them.

On 5 June 2021, Kabayel returned to the ring to face former WBC title challenger Kevin Johnson. He retained his WBA Continental title and undefeated record with a wide unanimous decision, with scores of 118–111, 118–111, and 119–110 in his favour. Kabayel next faced Pavel Sour on 14 May 2022. He won the fight by a first-round technical knockout.

Personal life 
Kabayel is Kurdish and was born in Leverkusen. He currently resides in Bochum.

Professional boxing record

References

External links

Agit Kabayel - Profile, News Archive & Current Rankings at Box.Live

1992 births
Living people
German male boxers
Heavyweight boxers
European Boxing Union champions
German people of Kurdish descent
Sportspeople from Leverkusen
Kurdish sportspeople